Pteridium esculentum, commonly known as bracken fern, Austral bracken or simply bracken, is a species of the bracken genus native to a number of countries in the Southern Hemisphere. Esculentum means edible. First described as Pteris esculenta by German botanist Georg Forster in 1786, it gained its current binomial name in 1908.

Morphology 
P. esculentum grows from creeping rhizomes, which are covered with reddish hair. The fronds are stiff with a brown stripe.

Distribution 
It is found in all states of Australia apart from the Northern Territory, as well as New Zealand, Norfolk Island, Malaysia, Polynesia, and New Caledonia. In New South Wales, it occurs across central, eastern and southern parts of the state. It can also be weedy and invade disturbed areas. In Western Australia, it grows near the southern and western coastlines, as far north as Geraldton.

Ecology 
Like its northern hemisphere relatives, Pteridium esculentum is very quick to colonise disturbed areas and can outcompete other plants to form a dense understorey. It is often treated as a weed. It does create a more humid sheltered microclimate under its leaves and is food for a variety of native insects. Two species of fruit fly (Drosophila) were recorded in a field study near Sydney. Another study near Sydney yielded 17 herbivorous arthropods (15 insects and two mites), notable for the lack of Hymenoptera (ants, bees, wasps, and sawflies) and beetles.

Uses 
The Māori of New Zealand used the rhizomes of Pteridium esculentum as a staple food, especially for exploring or hunting groups away from permanent settlements; much of the widespread distribution of this species in present-day New Zealand is in fact a consequence of prehistoric deforestation and subsequent tending of  stands on rich soils (which produced the best rhizomes).

Aborigines in Australia ate the roots after they were pounded into a paste and roasted.

Pteridium esculentum contains the known bracken carcinogen ptaquiloside. Concentrations of ptaquiloside in bracken in New Zealand vary greatly, and in a high proportion of stands ptaquiloside is not found. A higher incidence of ptaquiloside, and some very high concentrations, are found in areas where bovine enzootic haematuria and/or acute haemorrhagic syndrome was known to occur.

References

External links 
 
 

Flora of New South Wales
Flora of Queensland
Flora of South Australia
Flora of Western Australia
Flora of Tasmania
Ferns of New Zealand
Plants described in 1786
Dennstaedtiaceae